Club Baloncesto Getafe, also known as Viten Getafe by sponsorship reasons, is a professional basketball team based in Getafe, Community of Madrid, Spain.

History
Founded in 2014 as a merge of the main basketball clubs in the city, it played in LEB Plata as the reserve team of Baloncesto Fuenlabrada.

In 2016, both clubs ended their relationship and CB Getafe registered at Primera División.

Season by season

References

External links
CB Getafe Official Website

Basketball teams in the Community of Madrid
Former LEB Plata teams
Basketball teams established in 2014
2014 establishments in the Community of Madrid
Sport in Getafe